Jamair was a privately owned airline based in Calcutta, India and has served as non-scheduled charter as well as scheduled services. .

History 
Jamair was formed in 1946 by James B Muff, a former Chief Engineer at China National Aviation Corporation (CNAC) and Eddie Quinn, a radio operator and pilot with CNAC. They were financially backed by the Maharajah Jam Sahib of Nawanagar and so was based out of Jamnagar where the Maharaja developed an air base for the aircraft. In 1949 - 50 they bought the Maharajah's interests in the business and moved to Dum Dum Airport in Calcutta, West Bengal with a fleet of 5 C47/DC 3s, loads of spares and a small engineering team. Mr.C.L.Chandak and his brother Mr.P.C.Chandak the experienced  business family were taken in to Board as Directors and  Jamair began operating air supply missions to nearby states in the North East, but as commercial trade improved rapidly post WW11, the Airline began receiving Charter orders from export houses and so began International cargo services as far away as South America & Europe. After nationalisation of internal routes in August 1953, Jamair reverted to being a private charter company. Business picked up soon and charters to major Indian cities like Bombay, Bangalore and Delhi were added to their schedule. In early sixties, this airline also used to operate from Delhi Safdarjung Airport to Jodhpur, Bikaner and Sriganganagar in Rajasthan. In 1951, Herbert Dequadros aka Bob Dequadros from Burma Air joined the team as head Engineer and General Manager and with his expertise the airline grew in business and expanded in 1974 with additional 3 DC 4s purchased from Indian Airlines. These large bodied aircraft were commissioned to fly on commercial routes carrying passengers from Calcutta to Bombay via Panagarh in West Bengal. Out of the 3 aircraft, one was de-commissioned for scrap and spares were used to keep the balance 2 flying. However, these planes proved too costly for the Airline and in 1975, they were re -sold to private operator Air Works India in Bombay. The DC 3s remained in the fleet with 2 out of 5 meeting with accidents, some severely with loss of lives. In 1976, the first batch of Boeing 737s came into operations by Indian Airlines and the DGCA authorised the aircraft to service similar Jamair routes, thus leading to losses for the old airline. Around 1966, the company invited a business partner so as to financially sustain the Airline, but this proved troublesome for the original owners over the years and the company became embroiled in legal battles right to the last day of operations. In 1971, Bob Dequadros became the 3rd partner with 40% stake in the Airline. Founder partner James B. Muff remained in New Delhi for the latter part of his life overseeing operations from the Northern part of India. He eventually became ill and died in Calcutta in 1977. Rising fuel costs, labor problems, local competition, a shrinking fleet and legal battles between partners eventually broke the company apart and in late 1977 operations ceased. The demise of James B. Muff left partner Bob Dequadros to conclude the numerous legal battles till his death in 1981. The remaining DC3s were scrapped in 1978 and money from the scrap dealers went to pay off staff and legal fees.

Incidents and accidents 
 15 May 1954 - A Douglas C-47B (registration VT-DGO) operated by Jamair touched down at Saugaon after a high approach. An overshoot was imminent, but the pilot realised that the aircraft could not be pulled up before the end of the runway. He retracted the undercarriage, causing the plane to slid off the runway, coming to rest at the edge of a deep drain.
 7 December 1961 - A Douglas C-47A (registration VT-AZV) operated by Jamair crashed on takeoff from Amritsar, India due to fuel starvation and pilot error; both pilots survived, but the aircraft was written off.
 On 5 December 1970, - Douglas C-47A VT-CZC crashed shortly after take-off from Safdarjung Airport, New Delhi following an engine failure. The aircraft was operating a non-scheduled passenger flight. Five of the sixteen people on board were killed.
 On 26 March 1971 - Douglas C-47A VT-ATT crashed into a hill near Hashimara whilst on a flight from Guwahati Airport to Bagdogra Airport. All 15 people on board were killed.

Fleet 
The fleet consisted of 5 Douglas DC-3 & 3 DC-4 aircraft in 1977.

References 

Defunct airlines of India
Companies based in Kolkata
Airlines established in 1946
Airlines disestablished in 1977
Indian companies disestablished in 1977
Indian companies established in 1946
Indian companies established in 1950